Vladimir Lvovich Lash (born 29 October 1895 in Moscow; died 29 January 1947) was a Russian and Soviet football player.

International career
Lash made his debut for Russia on 5 July 1914 in a friendly against Sweden.

External links
  Profile

1895 births
1947 deaths
Russian footballers
Russia international footballers
Soviet footballers
PFC CSKA Moscow players
Association football midfielders